The Roman Catholic Diocese of El Vigia-San Carlos del Zulia is a diocese located in the cities of El Vigía and San Carlos del Zulia in the Roman Catholic Archdiocese of Maracaibo in Venezuela.

History
On 7 July 1994 Blessed John Paul II established the Diocese of El Vigia–San Carlos del Zulia from the Diocese of Cabimas, Metropolitan Archdiocese of Maracaibo and Metropolitan Archdiocese of Mérida.

Bishops

Ordinaries
William Enrique Delgado Silva (14 Apr 1999 – 26 Jul 2005) Appointed, Bishop of Cabimas
José Luis Azuaje Ayala (15 Jul 2006 – 30 Aug 2013)
Juan de Dios Peña Rojas (17 Apr 2015 – present)

Other priest of this diocese who became bishop
Victor Hugo Basabe, appointed Bishop of San Felipe

See also
Roman Catholicism in Venezuela

References

External links
 GCatholic.org
 Catholic Hierarchy 

Roman Catholic dioceses in Venezuela
Roman Catholic Ecclesiastical Province of Maracaibo
Christian organizations established in 1994
Roman Catholic dioceses and prelatures established in the 20th century
Zulia
1994 establishments in Venezuela
El Vigia